Estap A.Ş. is a company based in Istanbul, Turkey, specializing in the electronic enclosures industry.

Company Overview
Estap A.S. specializes in enclosures for data communication equipment such racks, cabinets and accessories for networking, servers, datacenters, outdoor applications, industrial usage, telecommunication and fiber optic infrastructure.

Estap owns and operates its factory in Eskişehir and employs nearly 400 people. Estap is the largest manufacturer of enclosures for date communication equipment. Having 70% of its production to approximately 70 foreign countries as export-sales, Estap is ranked among the first 1000 export companies of Turkey.

Acquisition
Estap was acquired by Legrand Group on April 10, 2008.

References

External links 
 Estap Official Web Site
 Legrand Group Official Web Site 

Manufacturing companies based in Istanbul
Turkish brands